Joyce Wayne "Red" Murrell (June 27, 1921 – February 10, 2001) was a Western swing performer from Missouri. He led one of the more notable Western swing bands in California, Red Murrell and his Ozark Playboys. He was a popular session guitar player for many other artists as well. Early in his career, he played with Billy Hughes's band, The Pals of the Pecos. In 1954 he went to work as a disc jockey for KEEN radio (1370 AM) in San Jose.

Discography 

note: (v) = vocal, (i) = instrumental track

Compilations
 Sittin' On Top Of The World (Jasmine JASMCD-3544, 2004)

References

Bibliography
 Malone, Bill C. Country Music, U.S.A.. University of Texas Press, 2002. 
 Komorowski, Adam. Swinging Hollywood Hillbilly Cowboys (Properbox 85, 2004) booklet.
 La Chapelle, Peter. Proud to Be an Okie: Cultural Politics, Country Music, and Migration to Southern California. University of California Press, 2007. 

Singer-songwriters from Missouri
Western swing performers
American country singer-songwriters
1921 births
2001 deaths
People from Willow Springs, Missouri
20th-century American singers
Country musicians from Missouri